The Princess Margaret Range, also called the Princess Margaret Mountains, are a mountain range on Axel Heiberg Island in Nunavut, Canada. The range is one of the most northern ranges in the world and of the Arctic Cordillera.

See also
List of mountain ranges

Further reading
 H.P. Trettin, Ed., Geology of the Innuitian Orogen and Arctic Platform of Canada and Greenland, PP 445, 493 
 Mark Nuttall, Encyclopedia of the Arctic, P 181
 Stuart Anderson, Travels with Anne: One Couple's Amazing, Stupendous, Almost Unbelievable Adventuers in Remote Parts of the World, P 202
  Willem Bakhuys Roozeboom, Through My Viewfinder, P 216
  W. Brent Garry, Jacob E. Bleacher, Editors, Analogs for Planetary Exploration, P 251

External links
Peakbagger.com: Princess Margaret Mountains

Arctic Cordillera
Mountain ranges of Qikiqtaaluk Region